is a Japanese football player. He plays for Avispa Fukuoka in the J1 League.

Career
Yota Maejima joined J2 League club Yokohama FC in 2016. On September 22, he debuted in Emperor's Cup (v AC Nagano Parceiro). 

In December 2021, it was announced that Maejima would be joining J1 League club Avispa Fukuoka.

Club statistics
.

References

External links
Profile at Avispa Fukuoka

1997 births
Living people
Association football people from Kanagawa Prefecture
Japanese footballers
J2 League players
J3 League players
Yokohama FC players
Kataller Toyama players
Mito HollyHock players
Avispa Fukuoka players
Association football midfielders